The Swan Road is the third album by the Ukrainian black metal band Drudkh, released in 2005. It is characterized by shorter songs and more prominent lyrics than are found on previous Drudkh releases. The lyrics are all taken from the epic poem Haydamaky, by Ukrainian national poet Taras Shevchenko, about the Ukrainian anti-Polish peasant rebellion of 1768. The name of the introductory track refers to the year of the greatest Cossack anti-Polish uprising set in Ukraine. The final track is an epic song on the destruction of Zaporizhian Sich by the Russian army in 1775. This album contains an increased use of distortion in the mix and more frequent usage of blast beats, but the last three tracks are considerably more low-key for Drudkh, with the final track ("Song of Sich Destruction") being a folk ballad, presaging the direction they would pursue further on the following year's Songs of Grief and Solitude.

Additionally, "Song of Sich Destruction" is not performed by Drudkh, but is a recording of a traditional Ukrainian Duma (folk song) performed by the bandura-player Igor Rachok.

Track listing

Critical reception

The album received critical acclaim.

References

External links 
 «Лебединий шлях» Encyclopaedia Metallum
 «Лебединий шлях» lyrics
 «Лебединий шлях» ofsite

2005 albums
Drudkh albums
Season of Mist albums